The Ptarmigan and Tom Mine were gold producers located in the Northwest Territories, Canada at Yellowknife. The property was staked by prospectors in 1936 and acquired by Cominco in 1938. The mine first produced between 1941 and 1942 but closed due to wartime restrictions. The old property was demolished in 1969–1970. A new company, Treminco Resources Limited, reopened the workings in 1985 and production from the Tom portal began in 1986 with material being trucked to Giant Mine. The old Ptarmigan mine shaft was dewatered and production began in 1987. A new mill was built at the property and was operational in July 1989. Low gold prices forced the company to close the mines in 1997.

Trivello Energy Corp. changed its name to Equitas Resources Corp. and trades on the TSX Venture Exchange under the trading symbol "EQT".

References

Gold mines in the Northwest Territories
Underground mines in Canada

Former mines in Canada